Teldenia illunata is a moth in the family Drepanidae. It was described by Warren in 1907. It is found in New Guinea.

The length of the forewings is 13–15 mm for males and 13-15.5 mm for females. The forewings are white, but the costa is buff. There is a double lunulate postmedial, a single lunulate subterminal and dotted terminal fasciae which are buff or brown and often very faint. The hindwings are as the forewings, but the costa is white.

References

Moths described in 1907
Drepaninae